Alfunction (born Alan Leonard James; June 9, 1972 in Costa Mesa, California), is an American guitarist. His stage name was bestowed upon him in 1994, by future bandmate Lauren Boquette, in reference to his band at the time, "Malfunction". He played guitar as a founding member of Six, from its beginning in 2001, until its disbanding in 2010.

He was previously a hired guitarist for Cypress Hill during the Skull and Bones tours, making his debut U.S. performance for the band while playing keyboard on the Conan O'Brien show. Alfunction went on to play guitar for Cypress Hill until July 2000, when he toured with Famous on the Tattoo the Earth festival.

In late 2010, he performed with Killing Joke, taking over bass guitar duties for original bassist Martin Glover on the North American tour in support of the Absolute Dissent Album.

A Six song he co-wrote, "Circles (Better Than Mine)", was used in  the WWE SmackDown vs. Raw 2009 video game.

Discography

Malfunction
 Fuse (1995)

Six
 When the Beauty's Gone (2001)
 The Price of Faith (2004)
 Between the Warning and the War (2007)

The Heathens
 Beach Blanket Beatdown! (2006)
 Splittin' Lanes, Takin' Names (2013)

Studio credits
 Jason Walker – "Set It Free" (2005) – guitar

References

External links
 
 Alfunction on the Fender website

American heavy metal guitarists
American punk rock guitarists
Living people
1972 births
American male guitarists
Guitarists from California
21st-century American guitarists
21st-century American male musicians